The 2020 European Judo Championships were held in Prague, Czech Republic from 19 to 21 November 2020.

Medal overview

Men

Women

Medal table

Participating nations

References

External links
 
 Results

 
European Judo Championships
European Judo Championships
European Judo Championships
Sports competitions in Prague
International sports competitions hosted by the Czech Republic
European Judo Championships
2020s in Prague
European Judo Championships